Russellville is an unincorporated community in Upper Oxford Township in Chester County, Pennsylvania, United States. Russellville is located at the intersection of Pennsylvania Route 10 and Pennsylvania Route 896.

References

External links

Unincorporated communities in Chester County, Pennsylvania
Unincorporated communities in Pennsylvania